Muhammad Ali Pate CON (born 6 September 1968) is a Nigerian physician and politician who is Professor of the Practice of Public Health Leadership in the Department of Global Health and Population at Harvard University.  He formerly served as the Global Director for Health, Nutrition and Population and Director of the Global Financing Facility for Women, Children and Adolescents (GFF) at the World Bank Group. Pate is also the former Minister of State for Health in Nigeria.

On Tuesday, October 11, 2022, Pate, along with  Ngozi Okonjo-Iweala, and Amina J. Mohammed were conferred with Nigeria's national honours. Pate was conferred with Commander of the Order of the Niger (CON).

Earlier in 2019, Pate was appointed Julio Frenk Professor of Public Health Leadership at the Harvard T. H. Chan School of Public Health. Pate was also the former Minister of Health in Nigeria. His appointment in July 2011 followed his role as the executive director of the National Primary Health Care Development Agency in Abuja. He resigned as Nigeria's Minister of State for Health effective 24 July 2013 to take up the position of Professor in Duke University's Global Health Institute, USA. He is formerly the chief executive officer of Big Win Philanthropy and an adjunct professor of Global Health of the Duke University Global Health Institute.

On September 1, 2021, Pate returned to Harvard University as a Julio Frenk Professor of the Practice of Public Health Leadership at the Harvard T.H. Chan School of Public Health.

In February 2023, Muhammad Ali Pate was appointed Chief Executive Officer of GAVI, the Vaccine Alliance, which works to provide vaccines in low-income countries.

Early life and education 
Muhammad Ali Pate was born in the Misau local government area of Bauchi State in Nigeria and was raised in the north of the country. He is the son of a fulani herdsman.

The first in his family to complete a secondary school education, Pate graduated from high school to enter the Ahmadu Bello University (ABU) medical school in Kaduna State, Nigeria. He graduated from ABU and moved to Gambia where he worked in rural hospitals for a few years. He was then a fellow in infectious diseases at the University of Rochester Medical Center in the United States. He is an American Board-Certified MD in both Internal Medicine and Infectious Diseases, with an MBA (Health Sector Concentration) from Duke University USA. Prior to this he studied at the University College London. He also has a Masters in Health System Management from the London School of Hygiene & Tropical Medicine, UK.

Personal life
Muhammad Pate is married and has four daughters and two sons. He resides in northern Virginia. He is a practicing Muslim. Pate holds the equivalent of a knighthood title as "Chigarin Misau" from the village where he was born.

Early career 
Prior to his appointment to the NPHCDA in 2008, Muhammad Pate had an extensive career spanning over 10 years at the World Bank in Washington DC and held several senior positions including Senior Health Specialist and Human Development Sector Coordinator for the East Asia/Pacific Region and Senior Health Specialist for the African Region. While at the World Bank, a major project led by Pate was the far-reaching health sector reform programmes in Africa, East Asia and other regions of the World Bank. Of note is his initiation of landmark Public Private Partnership to replace a National Referral Hospital in Lesotho, Africa.

Other Board, Commission and Committee Memberships 
•	Co-chair (along with Margaret Kruk), The Lancet Global Health Commission on High Quality Health Systems. Report was launched on September 6, 2018
•	Member, Lancet Commission on Malaria Eradication -ongoing
•	Member, Lancet Commission on the Future of Health in Sub-Saharan Africa (report 09/2017)
•	Member, Independent Monitoring Board of the Global Polio Eradication Initiative 
•	Board member, American International Health Alliance, Washington D.C. 2015–2022
•	Board member, Aceso Global, Washington DC 2015–2022
•	Board member, Healthcare Leadership Academy
•	Member, Investment Committee, Flint Atlantic Capital
•	Member, Steering Committee on the Value of Vaccination Research Network, Harvard University
•	Member, Steering Committee, Study on the Assessment of the Impact of Polio Eradication on Routine Immunization and Primary Health Care, Bill and Melinda Gates Foundation, 2011–2012
•	Editorial advisory board, BMJ Global Health
•	Advisory Board member, Ethiopian International Primary Health Care Institute
•	Senior Fellow of the Nigeria Leadership Initiative (NLI), Inducted at Yale University, New Haven Connecticut, April 2015

Recognition
 2012 – Harvard Health Leader, awarded by the Harvard Ministerial Leadership Program

Recent publications

Book chapters and technical reports 
 Baris, E., Silverman, R., Wang, H., Zhao, F., Pate, M., Walking the Talk: Reimagining Primary Healthcare in the post-COVID-19 era. Published by the World Bank, April 2022.
 Liam Donaldson, Thomas Frieden, Susan Goldstein, Muhammad Pate. Every virus. 17th Report of the Independent Monitoring Board (IMB) of the Global Polio Eradication Initiative (GPEI). June 2021. 
 Liam Donaldson, Thomas Frieden, Susan Goldstein, Muhammad Pate. Every virus. 16th Report of the Independent Monitoring Board (IMB) of the Global Polio Eradication Initiative (GPEI). June 2019. 
 Liam Donaldson, Thomas Frieden, Susan Goldstein, Muhammad Pate. Every virus. 15th Report of the Independent Monitoring Board (IMB) of the Global Polio Eradication Initiative (GPEI). June 2018. 
 Liam Donaldson, Thomas Frieden, Susan Goldstein, Muhammad Pate. Every virus. 14th Report of the Independent Monitoring Board (IMB) of the Global Polio Eradication Initiative (GPEI). June 2017. 
 Emmanuel Jimenez and Muhammad Pate. Reaping a Demographic Dividend in Africa's Largest Country: Nigeria. In: Hans Groth & John F. May, eds. "Africa's Population: In Search of a Demographic Dividend", Dordrecht: Springer Publishers, 2017 (ISBN 978-3-319-46887-7).
 Muhammad Pate. Contributor to "The Art and Science of Delivery": McKinsey's Voices on Society, Published 2013 in honor of the 10th Anniversary of the Skoll World Forum. 
 
 
 Pate M.A., Beeharry G., Abramson W. Improving health care access for the poor: A case study of the Washington, D.C. public health care reforms. Presented at the 4th Europe and the Americas conference on health sector reforms, February 2002, Malaga, Spain.

External links
Personal website: https://muhammadpate.com

Lancet Global Health Commission profile: https://www.hqsscommission.org/people/muhammad-a-pate/

References

Federal ministers of Nigeria
Nigerian civil servants
Nigerian public health doctors
Alumni of University College London
Alumni of the London School of Hygiene & Tropical Medicine
Duke University alumni
1968 births
Living people